Kuntur Jiwaña (Aymara kunturi condor, jiwaña to die; massacre, slaughter, slaughtering, also spelled Condor Jihuaña) is a mountain in the Bolivian Andes which reaches a height of approximately . It is located in the La Paz Department, Loayza Province, on the border of the municipalities of Cairoma and Luribay. Kuntur Jiwaña lies east of Janq'u Willk'i.

References 

Mountains of La Paz Department (Bolivia)